Eretmocera dorsistrigata is a moth of the family Scythrididae. It was described by Baron Walsingham in 1889. It is found in Tanzania (Zanzibar).

References

Endemic fauna of Tanzania
dorsistrigata
Moths described in 1889